The 2022 Kharkiv counteroffensive was a counteroffensive by the Armed Forces of Ukraine on the Russian-occupied Ukrainian territory of the Kharkiv Oblast which was launched on 6 September 2022. Following the launch of the Kherson counteroffensive in Southern Ukraine in late August, Ukrainian forces began a second counteroffensive in early September in Kharkiv Oblast, in Eastern Ukraine.

During the offensive, Ukraine had retaken over 500 settlements and 12,000 square kilometers of territory in the Kharkiv region.

Background 

Russian offensives in the first months of its invasion of Ukraine left large swathes of the Kharkiv Oblast under Russian control, including the key logistical hubs of Izium and Kupiansk. The majority of Kharkiv Oblast remained within Ukrainian control, however, including the city of Kharkiv, where the Russian military continuously bombarded with rocket, artillery, and cluster munition until August.

Ukrainian forces held off Russian advances towards Kharkiv, then launched counteroffensives in March and May pushing the Russians from the outskirts of the city. By 6 June, the Russian bombardment of Kharkiv had killed 606 civilians and injured 1,248 according to Amnesty International.

The battle lines in the greater Kharkiv Oblast remained largely static over the next few months as Ukrainian and Western military analysts believed Russia lacked the ground forces to renew its offensive. The Kharkiv death toll exceeded 1,000 by August.

By September 2022, Oleksandr Syrskyi, who had been in charge of the defense of Kyiv at the beginning of the invasion and later received the title of Hero of Ukraine for his service, was appointed to command the Ukrainian land forces in Kharkiv Oblast. The counteroffensive was performed under his command, and Syrskyi is considered to be its architect.

Counteroffensive

Prelude 
After weeks of Ukrainian propaganda about a counteroffensive in southern Ukraine, Russia redeployed thousands of troops, including elite units such as the 1st Guards Tank Army, to Kherson Oblast, leaving its remaining troops manning a "stretched and tired Russian front that spanned some 1,300km — roughly the distance from London to Prague."

The arrival of US-supplied HIMARS guided rocket artillery enabled Ukrainian forces to strike 70 kilometers behind Russian lines, targeting Russian bases and ammunition depots as far back as Kupiansk and Kivsharivka in the weeks preceding the eastern counteroffensive. These strikes further weakened Russian logistics and morale.

On 29 August, Ukraine announced it would soon launch an offensive in the Kherson region of southern Ukraine. Ukrainian units attacked soon after, and Russia's attention shifted to its Kherson line. While the Kherson offensive might have been genuine, Western analysts view it as part of a ploy to divert Russian forces away from Kharkiv prior to Ukraine's much larger eastern counteroffensive. In any case, Russian forces in Kharkiv were left understrength and unprepared in the days preceding 6 September. 

Russian authorities postponed annexation referendums in Russian-occupied Ukraine on 5 September 2022 due to security concerns.

First phase (6–12 September 2022)

Initial advance 
On 6 September 2022, Ukrainian forces launched a counteroffensive in the Kharkiv region, taking Russian forces by surprise. In a 10 September interview with the Guardian, Ukrainian special forces spokesman Taras Berezovets stated Russia "thought [the counteroffensive] would be in the south… then, instead of the south, the offensive happened where they least expected, and this caused them to panic and flee."

One military expert said that it was the first time since World War II that whole Russian units had been lost in a single battle.

Breakthrough 

On 6 September, having concentrated their forces north of Balakliia at Pryshyb, a small village about 15 km northwest of Balakliia, Ukrainian troops launched a counteroffensive in the Kharkiv Oblast, which drove Russian forces back to the left bank of the Donets and Serednya Balakliika rivers. The Ukrainian forces involved are Ukrainian special forces, plus tanks, armoured personnel carriers and troops from the 92nd Mechanised Brigade.

On the same day, Ukrainian forces captured Verbivka, about 8 km east of Pryshyb and less than 3 km northwest of Balakliia. Several Russian sources reported that Russian forces demolished unspecified bridges on the eastern outskirts of Balakliia to prevent further Ukrainian advances.

Ukrainian troops then went on the offensive in the directions of Balakliia, Volokhiv Yar, Shevchenkove, Kupiansk and the districts Savyntsi and Kunye, situated east of Balakliia. According to Russian sources on this line of contact Ukrainians were opposed in some areas of the line by lightly armed forces of the DPR Militia, while Ukrainian sources said that the forces in this region were professional Russian soldiers, not conscripts from the Donbas.

Russian sources claimed this success was likely due to the relocation of Russian forces to Kherson, in response to the Ukrainian offensive there.

SOBR units of Russian National Guard forces lost control of Balakliia, about 44 km northwest of Izium, although Ukraine did not establish control of the city until 10 September. Near the city, Ukrainian forces recaptured the largest ammunition storage base of the Central Rocket and Artillery Directorate of the Armed Forces of Ukraine. Ukrainian forces also regained control over more than 20 settlements. On the same day, Ukrainian media reported that Ukrainian forces captured a high-ranking Russian officer on the Kharkiv front. Based on footage of the man, it was speculated that he was Lieutenant General Andrei Sychevoi, Commander of the Western Military District of the Russian Armed Forces.

On 9 September, the Russian-backed administration ordered  the evacuation into Russia of the population from Izium, Kupiansk and Velykyi Burluk. Local residents later reported that at this point Russian soldiers in the area began to flee villages, leaving behind their weaponry, before Ukrainian troops even arrived. Later in the day Ukrainian forces reached Kupiansk, a vital transit hub at the junction of several of the main railway lines supplying Russian troops at the front. The Institute for the Study of War said it believed Kupiansk would likely fall in the next 72 hours. In response to the Ukrainian advance, Russian reserve units were sent as reinforcements to both Kupiansk and Izium.

On 10 September, Ukrainian forces retook Kupiansk and Izium, and were reportedly advancing towards Lyman. An advisor to the head of Kharkiv regional council, Natalia Popova, posted photos on Facebook of soldiers holding a Ukrainian flag outside Kupiansk city hall. Ukrainian security officials and police moved into the recaptured settlements to check the identities of those who stayed under Russian occupation. Later that day, Luhansk Oblast Governor Serhiy Haidai claimed that Ukrainian soldiers had advanced into the outskirts of Lysychansk, while Ukrainian partisans had reportedly managed to capture parts of Kreminna. Haidai stated Russian forces had fled the city, leaving Kreminna "practically empty".

The New York Times said "the fall of the strategically important city of Izium, in Ukraine's east, is the most devastating blow to Russia since its humiliating retreat from Kyiv." The Russian Ministry of Defence spokesperson Igor Konashenkov responded to these developments by claiming that Russian forces in the Balakliia and Izium area would "regroup" in the Donetsk area "in order to achieve the stated goals of the special military operation to liberate Donbas". Ukrainian President Zelenskyy said that "The Russian army in these days is demonstrating the best that it can do — showing its back. And, of course, it's a good decision for them to run." He claimed that Ukraine has recaptured  since the start of the counteroffensive.

On 11 September, Newsweek reported that Ukrainian forces had "penetrated Russian lines to a depth of up to 70 kilometers in some places and retaken more than 3,000 square kilometers of territory since September 6".
Reports that Russian troops had withdrawn from Kozacha Lopan and locals had raised the Ukrainian flag next to the town hall came in from objectiv.tv. A map used in the briefing of the Russian Ministry of Defense on the same day confirmed that Russian forces had withdrawn from  Kozacha Lopan, as well as Vovchansk and other settlements on the Ukraine-Russia border. Ukrainian forces also retook Velykyi Burluk.

On 28 September, Financial Times published an article with many interactive graphics and gave a vivid depiction of the reasons behind Ukrainian's lightning counteroffensive toward Kupiansk. It attributed western-supplied HIMARS as one of the reasons that enabled Ukraine to overpower Russian forces in merely 6 days, over a span of 90 km (roughly the distance between London and Cambridge), and recover more than 2,500 km2 of land.

Russian withdrawal from Kharkiv Oblast west of Oskil River 

In the afternoon of 11 September, the Russian Ministry of Defense announced the formal pullout of Russian forces from nearly all of Kharkiv Oblast. The ministry "announced that an 'operation to curtail and transfer troops' was underway." At 20:06 that day, Russian Kalibr cruise missiles struck Ukrainian critical infrastructure sites (including Kharkiv TEC-5), which left Poltava, Sumy, Kharkiv, Dnipropetrovsk, Donetsk, and parts of Odesa Oblasts without electricity. Meanwhile, clashes between Ukrainian attackers and Russian defenders continued at Lyman.

On 12 September, according to the summary of the General Staff of the Armed Forces of Ukraine, the Ukrainian Defense Forces cleared Russian troops in more than 20 settlements, most noticeably in Velykyi Burluk and Dvorichna. The Russian head of the Kharkiv occupation authority, Vitaly Ganchev, revealed on Russian state media Russia-24 that Ukrainian forces outnumbered Russian forces by "8 times". The border with the Russian Belgorod Oblast has been closed after some 5,000 civilians were "evacuated" to Russia.

Ukraine retook all of Kharkiv Oblast west of the Oskil River by 13 September, with media claiming that Ukrainian troops had entered Vovchansk.

Other gains 
In the morning of 11 September, Luhansk Oblast Governor Serhiy Haidai claimed that Russian forces had mostly left Starobilsk. In the same message, he claimed that Russian occupational authorities were also leaving from areas that Russia had controlled since 2014, though there was no clear evidence to verify this claim.

On 12 September, Ukrainian forces liberated Sviatohirsk, which Russian forces captured in June 2022, and inched closer to the administrative border between Kharkiv and Donetsk Oblasts as well as Lyman, a strategic railway town in Donetsk Oblast that Russian forces captured in late May 2022 after a fierce battle.

Reports of the Russian military moving out of areas they formerly controlled in Luhansk Oblast began on 12 September alongside a withdrawal from the city of Svatove; however, Russian troops returned to Svatove on 14 September.

On 12 September, President Zelenskyy said that Ukrainian forces have retaken a total of 6,000 km2 from Russia, in both the south and the east. On 13 September, during his nightly address, he claimed that the Ukrainian military has recaptured 8,000 km2 of territory from Russia.

According to Oryx, Russia had lost at least 338 pieces of military hardware in the five days to 11 September. This included fighter jets, tanks and trucks that had been destroyed, damaged or captured.

Second phase (13 September–2 October 2022)

Oskil River advance 
Despite Russia's intent to keep the front line along Oskil River, Ukrainian forces already crossed the river as early as 13 September at several locations. Around 13 September, Ukrainian forces crossed the river near Borova and established a bridgehead. By 24–25 September, Ukraine established at least five bridgeheads on the east side of Oskil River.

On 15 September, some Russian sources claimed Ukrainian forces set up artillery positions at Hryanykivka, across from Dvorichna on the east side of Oskil River. On the same day, Ukrainian forces recaptured Sosnove in Donetsk Oblast, and forced Russian forces to withdraw from Studenok, a village in Kharkiv Oblast and southeast to Izium, to avoid encirclement.

On 16 September, Ukrainian forces captured Kupiansk-Vuzlovyi, on the east side of Oskil River and across from Kupiansk, and the eastern portion of Kupiansk, establishing another bridgehead over the Oskil River. This further threatens Russian supply lines in northern Luhansk Oblast, imperiling Russian operations throughout the rest of Donbas.

By 18 September, the Ukrainian military stated that it had crossed over to and controlled the east side of the Oskil River.

On 19 September, video footage confirmed that Ukrainian forces had liberated the village of Bilohorivka in Luhansk Oblast, signifying that Russia no longer maintained full control of the region.

On 22 September, ISW reported that "Ukrainian forces have taken ground east of Dvorichna and are fighting in Tavilzhanka, which is reportedly still contested territory." There were reports that Ukrainian forces liberated Hrianykivka, a settlement just west of Tavilzhanka, on September 15 when Ukraine set up artillery positions there. Thus it is "consistent with previous reporting on continued Ukrainian efforts to penetrate the current Russian defensive lines that run along the Oskil River and push eastward."

On 23 September Ukrainian Armed Forces liberated the village of Yatskivka in Donetsk Oblast according to Oleksii Hromov, deputy head of operations directorate of the general staff of UAF.

On 24 September, Ukrainian forces liberated Horobivka, a settlement east of Hrianykivka and on the east side of Oskil River. Ukrainian forces liberated two more settlements by 24 September: Kucherivka and Podoly, both sandwiched between Kupiansk-Vuzlovyi and Petropavlivka.

On 25 September, Ukrainian forces likely obtained control of Maliivka, a settlement north of Kharkiv-Donetsk border and east to Pisky-Radkivskyi, during the Second Battle of Lyman. By 26 September, Ukraine has successfully recaptured much of Kupiansk District.

On 26 September, Ukrainian forces advanced north from Donetsk Oblast and liberated Pisky-Radkivskyi.

On 27 September, further incremental gains were reported east of the Oskil river, with Ukrainian forces entering the towns of Lidkodub and Korovyi Yar.

Encirclement and recapture of Lyman 

As a result of the Ukraine's "lightning counteroffensive" throughout September, Russian forces retreated to Lyman, a major city in Donetsk Oblast with critical Russian supply lines. According to the British Ministry of Defense, "Lyman's operational importance was due to its command over a road crossing over the Siverskyi Donets River, behind which Russia has been attempting to consolidate its defenses." On 26 September, the New York Times reported a standoff between the critical cities of then-Russian-held Lyman and Ukrainian-controlled Bakhmut, held by Ukraine. With the approaching winter likely to stall both militaries, Lyman was set to be the battle that decides the eastern theater of the war.

On 28 September, Ukrainian forces entered the town of Novoselivka located in the Donetsk region, about 12 km northwest of Lyman, on the left bank of the Oskil River, and is a strategic crossing point.

On 30 September, Ukrainian forces liberated Yampil, a key village  to the southeast of Lyman. A pro-Russian telegram channel reported "The Armed Forces of Ukraine managed to break through the defensive orders of the RF (Russian Federation) Armed Forces and force the Russian troops to retreat to the city (Lyman)." Zelenskyy also reported that Ukrainian troops had captured the town of Drobysheve,  to the northwest of Lyman.

On 1 October, there were video footage of Ukrainian troops raising the Ukrainian flag at an entrance to Lyman, and there were reportedly up to 5,000 Russian troops  encircled within the city. Serhii Cherevatyi, spokesperson for Ukraine's eastern forces, claimed that Ukrainian forces successfully surrounded Russian forces in the city. Ukrainian forces advanced into the city, and according to The Guardian, the battle in Lyman "was a bloody rout." Russian officers had refused invitations to surrender, so Russian troops fled in a disorganized manner. The city was significantly damaged during the Russian occupation, with locals stating only a few hundred remained of the 27,000 who lived in Lyman before the war. Russian authorities confirmed the loss of Lyman later that afternoon. While there are no clear estimates of casualties during the battle, Associated Press reporters noted that at least 18 Russian bodies remained on the streets on 3 October.

The gains came a day after Russian president Putin announced annexation of Russian-occupied territories at a ceremony in Moscow, claiming the occupied regions of Ukraine, including the Donbas, were now integral Russian territory. Retired US Lieutenant General, Ben Hodges, revealed that "[the recapture of Lyman] puts in bright lights that [Putin's] claim is illegitimate and cannot be enforced."

Reactions

Russia

On 7 September 2022, a day after the start of the Ukrainian offensive, Putin claimed during his speech at the Eastern Economic Forum in Vladivostok that "We have not lost anything and will not lose anything" in the war in Ukraine.

The near-complete silence of the Russian authorities on the defeat – or any explanation for the developments there – generated considerable anger among some pro-war commentators and Russian nationalists on social media. On 11 September, some called for President Vladimir Putin to make immediate changes to ensure final victory in the war, with a number of pro-war bloggers calling for mobilization inside Russia. Russian state-funded media later criticized the defeat, with a pro-Kremlin tabloid blaming "supply and manpower shortages, poor coordination, and tactical mistakes orchestrated by military officials".

The former separatist commander and pro-war military blogger Igor Girkin claimed that firing squad should execute Russian Defence Minister Sergei Shoigu, and he publicly expressed his belief that "the war in Ukraine will continue until the complete defeat of Russia. We have already lost; the rest is just a matter of time." He said that full mobilization in Russia remained the "last chance" for victory. Pro-Kremlin war journalist Alexander Kots publicly stated that "We need to do something about the system where our leadership doesn't like to talk about bad news, and their subordinates don't want to upset their superiors."

While Ukraine was conducting its counteroffensive, Vladimir Putin opened a Ferris wheel in Moscow's VDNKh and celebrated Moscow City Day. War bloggers criticized him for continuing the celebrations.

On the evening of 10 September, a festive fireworks display took place in Moscow. Many pro-war politicians inside Russia, like the leader of A Just Russia — For Truth Sergey Mironov, allegedly called for its cancellation before the event.

Chechen leader Ramzan Kadyrov questioned Russian leadership of the war, writing on Telegram: "They have made mistakes and I think they will draw the necessary conclusions. If they don't make changes in the strategy of conducting the special military operation in the next day or two, I will be forced to contact the leadership of the Defense Ministry and the leadership of the country to explain the real situation on the ground."

On 12 September, Mikhail Sheremet, a State Duma deputy from United Russia, advocated "full mobilization". On 13 September, the leader of the Communist Party of the Russian Federation Gennady Zyuganov spoke for the maximum mobilization of forces and resources, but later the Press Secretary of the CPRF Alexander Yushchenko said that Zyuganov called for the mobilization of the economy and resources, and not the population, and recommended to "execute some groups that engage in outright provocations".

Many outside Russia interpreted subsequent Russian attacks on Ukrainian infrastructure as an attempt to at least partially satisfy demands of radical war supporters in Russia, who called for further escalation of Russian tactics.

On 20 September, the State Duma introduced amendments to the Penal Code, introducing terms "mobilization", "martial law" and inserting Articles "Marauding" and "Surrendering voluntarily". On 20 September, pro-Kremlin administrations in different Russian-occupied territories of Ukraine announced "referendums" on merging these territories with Russia. Analysts consider that one of the aims of such a formal annexation of the territories is to give Putin a pretext of "defending Russian territory" if he needs to order a mobilization of Russia's conscripts.

On 21 September, Russian President Vladimir Putin announced a partial mobilisation. On 26 September, the British Ministry of Defense said that many new conscripts are already being deployed in Ukraine without any training or proper equipment. Some of the mobilized Russian men were killed less than two weeks after being drafted, including St. Petersburg lawyer Andrei Nikiforov, who was killed near the Ukrainian city of Lysychansk on 7 October. This indicated that Russian men are being sent to the front without basic military training, which would contradict Putin's promise that all mobilized civilians would undergo basic training before being sent into combat.

Worldwide 
The Institute for the Study of War (ISW) noted that the rapid pace of the Ukrainian counteroffensive was disrupting the Russian army's long-held ground lines of communication, used to supply the Russian army in northern Luhansk Oblast, and would lead to a serious hindrance to Russia's operations according to ISW's analysis. As of 11 September, ISW noted that Western weapons were necessary for the success of Ukraine, but not enough, and skillful planning and execution of the campaign played a decisive role in the lightning success. ISW contended that long preparations and the announcement of a counter-offensive in the Kherson region had confused the Russians, leading to a diversion of the Russian army's attention away from the Kharkiv region, where the Ukrainian army subsequently struck.

On 10 September, representatives of the British Ministry of Defence suggested that the Russian army practically had not defended most of the territories recaptured by Ukraine.

Reuters and the BBC called the loss of Izium, which the Russian army had been trying to occupy for over a month at the start of the invasion, a "great humiliation" for Russian President Vladimir Putin and Moscow's worst defeat since the retreat from Kyiv in March. Financial Times ran an article on 28 September depicting the counteroffensive as "[the] 90km journey that changed the course of the war in Ukraine." According to ISW, the recapture of Izium, occupied in early April, destroyed Russia's prospect of seizing the Donetsk Oblast.

According to Ukrainian foreign minister Dmytro Kuleba, Ukraine's counteroffensives proved that the Ukrainian military could end the war faster with more Western weapons, a statement that President Zelenskyy echoed on 12 September. Ukraine's successes in Kharkiv Oblast served as a crucial confidence boost for Kyiv, which is increasingly reliant on its Western allies for military aid.

The September 2022 Armenia–Azerbaijan clashes erupted shortly after Russia suffered setbacks in the Ukrainian Kharkiv counteroffensive, weakening its force projection in the region.

Aftermath of the first phase

Mass graves and evidence of torture 

After the successful recapture of the region from Russian forces, Ukrainian authorities discovered torture chambers that Russian troops had been using during their time in control of the area, including in the villages of Balakliia and Kozacha Lopan. Ukrainian President Volodymyr Zelenskyy stated that more than ten torture chambers, along with mass graves, had been discovered in the Kharkiv areas liberated by Ukrainian troops.

As Ukrainian forces entered the towns of Balakliia and Izium, they found numerous places where Russian occupation forces held Ukrainian civilians prisoner, with evidence of torture and executions. Russian forces also reportedly abducted seven Sri Lankan students. The death toll among civilians as result of the initial Russian siege and subsequent occupation was initially estimated at 1,000 residents. After the expulsion of Russian forces, witnesses described that Russians detained, abducted, tortured and executed local residents during the occupation; a number of burial sites were found.

Exhumation of the bodies from Izium mass graves buried in Pishanske cemetery started on 15 September, and the police revealed that most victims were civilians. Some bodies of civilians and soldiers had traces of torture, hands tied and rope around their necks, suggesting they were not killed in battle or bombing, but executed as prisoners. Russian diplomats dismissed the claims as a "provocation" and Kremlin spokesman Dmitry Peskov rejected Ukraine's accusations as a "lie", but satellite images that Maxar published confirmed presence of the graves before the Ukrainian counteroffensive. In total, ten torture and execution sites were discovered in the town of Izium.

Military decorations 

On 15 September President Zelenskyy visited the liberated city of Izium and decorated soldiers who had participated in the operation. In his daily address he named units that had participated: the 14th and 92nd Separate Mechanized Brigades, 25th Separate Airborne Brigade, 80th Separate Airborne Assault Brigade, 107th MLRS Brigade, the 40th, 43rd, 44th Separate Artillery Brigades, 26th Artillery Brigade, 15th Separate Artillery Reconnaissance Brigade, and Main Intelligence Directorate.

Effect on Russian referendums 
On 12 September, Meduza reported that, per two sources close to the Kremlin, the proposed referendums for the annexation of the self-proclaimed Luhansk and Donetsk People's Republics had been postponed indefinitely, following earlier postponement from 11 September to 4 November. However, the counteroffensives in Kherson and Kharkiv ultimately brought forward the 2022 annexation referendums in Russian-occupied Ukraine, which Russian officials rescheduled from November to late September 2022.

Aftermath of the second phase

On 2 October, Ukrainian troops recaptured Dibrova in the Luhansk Oblast and by 5 October images appeared on social media of Ukrainian troops at the entrance sign to Hrekivka and Makiivka, 20 km southwest of Svatove. These were the first villages to be liberated in the Luhansk region.

On 3 October, some Ukrainian sources claimed that Russian forces had fled from Nyzhe Zolone, Pidlyman, Nyznya Zhuravka, Borova and Shyikivka in Kharkiv Oblast, and Ukrainian authorities regained control in these settlements. Ukrainian officials also claimed that the Ukrainian forces had retaken control of the Kreminna-Svatove Highway, although the ISW disputed this, and continue to consider it as Russian-controlled as of 4 October.

On 9 October, Ukraine reported that it had recaptured seven more villages in Svatove Raion: Novoliubivka, Nevske, Grekivka, Novoyehorivka (located in the Krasnorichenske settlement hromada), Nadiya, Andriivka, and Stelmakhivka (located in the Kolomyichykha settlement hromada).

On 24 October the General Staff of Ukraine's Armed Forces announced the recapture of four settlements: Nevske, Miasozharivka, Karmazynivka, in Luhansk Oblast, and Novosadove in Donetsk Oblast. According to the Russian WarGonzo project, they also took control of the Kreminna-Svatove Highway.

During November, there were little territorial changes due to the muddy terrain, although fierce battles raged every day. Much of the Russian defense line in northern Luhansk oblast became staffed with newly mobilized Russian conscripts throughout November. In early December, Ukrainian forces broke through Russian lines around Chervonopopivka, with fighting mostly centered west of the R-66 highway connecting Kreminna and Svatove. On 18 December, a geolocated video showed Ukrainian forces advancing in the Serebryansky forest south of Kreminna.

See also

 Battle of Balakliia
 Battle of Shevchenkove
 Battle of Kupiansk
 Second Battle of Lyman
 Territorial control during the Russo-Ukrainian War
 Makiivka surrender incident

References

Battles of the 2022 Russian invasion of Ukraine
Eastern Ukraine offensive
September 2022 events in Ukraine
October 2022 events in Ukraine
Battles involving the Donetsk People's Republic
Battles involving the Luhansk People's Republic
2022 counteroffensive